Amaioua is a genus of flowering plants in the family Rubiaceae. It was first described by Jean Baptiste Aublet in 1775. The genus is native to tropical America from southern Mexico to Brazil, including Cuba and Trinidad.

Species 
 Amaioua brevidentata Steyerm. - Venezuela, Guyana
 Amaioua contracta Standl. - Amazonas (state of Brazil)
 Amaioua corymbosa Kunth - southern Mexico to Brazil, including Cuba and Trinidad
 Amaioua guianensis Aubl. - Brazil, Perú, Ecuador, Colombia, Bolivia, Venezuela, Guyana, Suriname, French Guiana
 Amaioua intermedia Mart. ex Schult. & Schult.f. - Brazil, Perú, Bolivia
 Amaioua magnicarpa Dwyer - Panamá, Colombia
 Amaioua monteiroi Standl. - Pará
 Amaioua pedicellata Dwyer - Costa Rica, Panamá
 Amaioua pilosa K.Schum. - eastern Brazil

References

External links 
 Amaioua in the World Checklist of Rubiaceae

Rubiaceae genera
Cordiereae
Flora of Central America
Flora of South America
Flora of the Caribbean
Neotropical realm flora
Taxa named by Jean Baptiste Christian Fusée-Aublet